Eggleton is an English surname, derived from either Egleton in Rutland or Eggleton, Herefordshire.

Notable people with this surname include:
 Art Eggleton (born 1943), Canadian politician
 Ben Eggleton (born 1970), Australian physicist
 Bob Eggleton (born 1960), American artist
 David Eggleton (born 1952), New Zealand author
 Jaimee Eggleton (born 1964), Canadian figure skater
Jimmy Eggleton (1897–1963), English footballer
 Mark Eggleton, Australian musician
 Philip Eggleton (1903–1954), British biochemist
 Tony Eggleton (born 1932), Australian politician

References